Avaria hyerana is a species of moth of the family Tortricidae. It is found in Portugal, Spain, France, Italy, Greece, North Macedonia and on Sardinia, Sicily, Malta and the Canary Islands.

The wingspan is 20–25 mm. Adults have been recorded on wing from September to October.

The larvae feed on Asphodelus species. Larvae have been recorded in April.

Gallery

References

Moths described in 1858
Archipini
Moths of Europe